The Mercury Titleholders Championship was a golf tournament on the LPGA Tour from 1990 to 1999. It was played at three different courses in Florida. The event was separate from the Titleholders Championship, a former major championship on the LPGA Tour, and also from the CME Group Titleholders, which will become the final official event of the LPGA season starting in 2011.

Tournament locations

Winners
Mercury Titleholders Championship
1999 Karrie Webb
1998 Danielle Ammaccapane

Sprint Titleholders Championship
1997 Tammie Green
1996 Karrie Webb

Sprint Championship
1995 Val Skinner
1994 Sherri Steinhauer

Sprint Classic
1993 Kristi Albers

Centel Classic
1992 Danielle Ammaccapane
1991 Pat Bradley
1990 Beth Daniel

See also
 Centel Classic, a PGA Tour event also played at Killearn Country Club (1969–89)

References

Former LPGA Tour events
Golf in Florida
Sports in Tallahassee, Florida
Recurring sporting events established in 1990
Recurring sporting events disestablished in 1999
1990 establishments in Florida
1999 disestablishments in Florida
Women's sports in Florida